John Joseph Mathews (November 16, 1894 – June 16, 1979) (Osage) became one of the Osage Nation's most important spokespeople and writers, and served on the Osage Tribal Council during the 1930s. He studied at the University of Oklahoma, Oxford University, and the University of Geneva after serving as a flight instructor during World War I.

Mathews' first book was a history, Wah'kon-tah: The Osage and The White Man's Road (1929), which was selected by the Book-of-the-Month Club as their first by an academic press; it became a bestseller. His second book, Sundown (1934) is his most well known, an exploration of the disruption of the people and their society at the time of the oil boom, which also attracted criminal activities by leading whites in the county and state, including murder of Osage. In 1951 Mathews published a biography of E. W. Marland, noted oilman and governor of Oklahoma in the 1930s. His book The Osages: Children of the Middle Waters (1961) was a life work, preserving many collected stories and the oral history of the Osage.

In 1996 Mathews was posthumously inducted into the Oklahoma Historians Hall of Fame. The cabin in the Osage Hills where he did much of his writing was acquired about 2014 by the Nature Conservancy of Oklahoma. His gravesite is next to it. Both will be preserved within the Tallgrass Prairie Preserve.

Early life and education
Mathews was born at Pawhuska, Oklahoma as the only surviving son of five children of William Shirley and Eugenia (Girard) Mathews. His banker father was part Osage, the son of John Allan Mathews, a noted trader, and Sarah Williams, the mixed-race daughter of A-Ci'n-Ga, a full-blood Osage, and "Old Bill" Williams, a noted missionary and later Mountain Man who lived with the Osage. Because the Osage had a patrilineal kinship system, the Mathews descendants were excluded from belonging to one of the tribe's clans, as their Osage ancestry was through the maternal line of A-Ci'-Ga, rather than through a direct male ancestor.

Mathews' paternal grandparents had met in Kentucky, where "Old Bill" Williams had sent his daughters for school after his wife A-Ci'n-Ga had died. John Joseph Mathews' mother was Pauline Eugenia Girard, whose family had immigrated from France. The family had an "active interest in Osage culture."  The Mathews children were one-eighth Osage by ancestry, as well as Anglo-Scots-Irish and French; they all attended local schools in Pawhuska.

John had three sisters and one brother. His brother was killed as a child by a mountain lion that attacked him near their family home. Two of his sisters, Lillian and Marie Mathews, did not marry and lived in the family home at 911 Grandview Avenue in Pawhuska until their deaths.

Service in World War I came before college, and John Mathews became a flight instructor and second lieutenant after time in the cavalry. Afterward, he went to the University of Oklahoma, graduating with a degree in geology. He studied (at his own expense) at Oxford University in England, graduating in 1923 with a degree in natural science. He also studied international relations at the University of Geneva and the Graduate Institute of International Studies. In addition, he traveled in Africa before returning to the United States, determined to study the culture and traditions of the Osage.

Marriage and family

In 1924 in Geneva, Mathews married an American woman, Virginia Winslow Hopper.  They first settled in California, where their two children were born: John and Virginia. The couple divorced.

Mathews returned to Oklahoma in 1929, where he lived for the rest of his life. Years later, in 1945, he married Elizabeth Hunt. She worked with him on much of his research related to the Osage and their forced migration from Missouri to Oklahoma. He treated her son John Hunt, from her first marriage, as his stepson.

Mathews died in 1979 and was buried at his request near the cabin in the Osage Hills where he did much of his writing. He had five surviving great nieces and nephews: Fleur Feighan, William Feighan, Major (U.S. Army, Retired) Howard J. Schellenberg, III; Jeanne (Schellenberg) Hulse, and Maria Schellenberg.

Career
After his return to Oklahoma in 1929, Mathews began writing in the late 1920s. As a member of the tribe, he had headrights and received money from leases for oil wells, which enabled him to buy land, build a stone cabin, and pursue his writing career.

He published his first book, a work of literary non-fiction, Wah'kon-tah: The Osage and The White Man's Road (1932), with the University of Oklahoma Press. This was the first work by an academic press to be selected by the new Book-of-the-Month Club, and with that secondary publication, the book became a bestseller.

His most well-known work is Sundown (1934), his only novel. Mathews is described as introducing "the modern American Indian novel", a pattern for future works by Native American authors. It is marked by its realism, as Mathews wanted to represent the Indian in a way that had not been recognized in European-American cultural stereotypes.

The semi-autobiographical work is about Challenge "Chal" Windzer, a young Osage man of mixed-blood ancestry. After leaving home to study at the University of Oklahoma and serve in the military, Chal feels estranged when he returns to his tribal community. He suffers from alienation and hopelessness as his life takes a downward swerve. The novel is set during the turbulence of the oil boom that took place on Osage land in Oklahoma in the early 1920s, which generated great wealth for the many Osage enrolled citizens who had headrights. It depicts the frictions and disruption within the tribal community that accompanied this bonanza of wealth. In addition, it portrayed the swindles and numerous outright murders of Osage during the 1920s, a period they termed the "Reign of Terror", as white opportunists tried to get control of the Osage headrights.

(Note: see Osage Indian Murders. Failing to get relief from local law enforcement, the Osage appealed to the federal government for help, as their people were still being killed. Extensive local and corruption has been documented in conspiracies to get control of Osage headrights, involving state many leading whites of the region: ranchers, lawyers, judges, doctors, police, undertakers, and more. Agents of the new Federal Bureau of Investigation were assigned to investigate the murders and successfully prosecuted three men, but many more crimes passed without investigation.)

During the 1930s and the Great Depression, when Mathews was still living in his cabin, he was very politically active within the Osage Nation. As the people took advantage of the Indian Reorganization Act of 1934 and the Oklahoma Indian Welfare Act, Mathews helped the Osage Nation restore its self-government. He was elected to the Tribal Council, serving from 1934 to 1942. He helped found the Osage Tribal Museum, which opened in 1938 in Pawhuska, and donated numerous artifacts to it.

From 1939 to 1940 Mathews lived and studied in Mexico on a Guggenheim Fellowship. In 1940, Mathews served as the United States representative to the Indians of the Americas Conference at Michoacan, Mexico.

Later, Mathews concentrated again on his writing. His work Talking to the Moon (1945) is a retrospective account of the ten years he spent in the "blackjacks" of his homeland, observing nature and reflecting on the influence of the environment on Osage culture. He wrote much of this in the stone cabin that he built in the Osage Hills in 1929. This area is now preserved as part of the Tallgrass Prairie Preserve. The book is a combination of autobiography, philosophical treatise, and observations by an amateur naturalist. Some critics compared it to Henry David Thoreau's Walden. Lee Schweninger noted that Mathews used irony to create distance between the narrator and himself as the subject of autobiographical reflection. He also wrote about himself as a settler, and critiqued European-American culture, while committing actions similar to those of other settlers who disrupted the natural balance.

Mathews's Life and Death of an Oilman: The Career of E. W. Marland (1951) was his only biography; it explores the life of a multi-millionaire Oklahoma oilman and politician, who also served as governor of the state in the 1930s. He created a social scandal by marrying his much younger adoptive daughter, Lydie Marland.

Based on years of collecting information from tribal elders through the oral tradition, in addition to conducting historical research, Mathews wrote The Osages: Children of the Middle Waters (1961). It has been described as "his magnum opus and a pioneering achievement for both its reliance on the oral tradition and presentation of a particular tribal history from an Indian point of view." His book was the product of his working with tribal elders to preserve and interpret their common culture.

Two books of Mathews have been published posthumously, in efforts to bring his work to a wider audience. Another autobiography, Twenty Thousand Mornings was published in 2012, edited by Susan Kalter.

In the 1960s Mathews wrote a number of short stories, some drawing from folk traditions of the Osage and other cultures, including Scotland. Selected stories from these unpublished manuscripts were published in 2015 as Old Three Toes and Other Tales of Survival and Extinction. Mathews told these stories from the point of view of bird and animal protagonists, an act of imagination that decenters human life.

Works
Wah'kon-tah: The Osage and The White Man's Road (1929)
Sundown (1934)
Talking to the Moon (1945)
Life and Death of an Oilman: The Career of E. W. Marland (1951)
The Osages: Children of the Middle Waters (1961)

The following were published posthumously:
Twenty Thousand Mornings (2011), autobiography, ed. Susan Kalter
Old Three Toes and Other Tales of Survival and Extinction (2015), short stories, ed. Susan Kalter

Legacy and honors
1996, Mathews was posthumously inducted into the Oklahoma Historians Hall of Fame.
In 2017, a biography, John Joseph Mathews: Life of an Osage Writer, by Michael Snyder was published by the University of Oklahoma.
The stone cabin where Mathews did much of his writing is in the Osage Hills. The cabin and gravesite were acquired about 2014 by the Nature Conservancy of Oklahoma and added to its Tallgrass Prairie Preserve, which it administers. The cabin and gravesite will be preserved.

Notes

References
, November 2005, Air Force Museum
Native American Authors Project, Internet Public Library (accessed 6 March 2008)
Fredrick W. Boling, "Tribute to John Joseph Mathews: Osage Writer", Western Writers of America ROUNDUP Magazine, at Frederick Boling's website
"John Joseph Mathews", Enotes.com 
Guy Logsdon, "John Joseph Mathews", Oklahoma Historical Society's Encyclopedia of Oklahoma History & Culture

Further reading
Bob L. Blackburn, "Oklahoma Historians Hall of Fame John Joseph Mathews," The Chronicles of Oklahoma 74 (Fall 1996).
Bob Foreman, "Mathews' New Book Will Be Whopper," Tulsa (Oklahoma) Tribune, 3 November 1958. 
Guy Logsdon, "John Joseph Mathews: A Conversation," Nimrod 16 (Spring/Summer 1972).
Michael Snyder, "Friends of the Osages: John Joseph Mathews's 'Wah'Kon-Tah' and Osage-Quaker Cross-Cultural Collaboration," The Chronicles of Oklahoma 88.4 (Winter 2012-11).
Michael Snyder, John Joseph Mathews: Life of an Osage Writer, University of Oklahoma Press, 2017,

External links 
Book about Osage writer will be released Thursday
John Joseph Mathews, Western American Literature Research

1894 births
1979 deaths
People from Pawhuska, Oklahoma
Osage people
Native American novelists
American military personnel of World War I
University of Oklahoma alumni
20th-century American novelists
American male novelists
Alumni of the University of Oxford
University of Geneva alumni
Graduate Institute of International and Development Studies alumni
20th-century American male writers
Alumni of Merton College, Oxford
American expatriates in the United Kingdom
American expatriates in Switzerland